Lavaudieu is a commune in the Haute-Loire department in south-central France.

Geography
The village lies on the right bank of the Senouire, which flows west through the commune.

Population

Sights
Romanesque Lavaudieu Abbey, otherwise Lavaudieu Priory (Abbaye Saint-André de Lavaudieu), built by St Robert, the first abbot of La Chaise-Dieu, in the 11th century, which was at first a Benedictine priory, and later a house of secular canonesses from the Auvergnat nobility. It was raised to the status of abbey in 1719.

See also
Communes of the Haute-Loire department

References

Communes of Haute-Loire
Plus Beaux Villages de France